Antonio Floro is a Spanish football coach. He was in charge of the Canada men's national under-23 soccer team from July 2013. He is the son of Benito Floro.

In June 2015, he was named in charge of the Canadian representative team for the men's soccer tournament at the 2015 Pan American Games.

References

External links 

Spanish football managers
Year of birth missing (living people)
Living people